René Vietto (17 February 1914, Le Cannet, Alpes-Maritimes – 14 October 1988, Orange, Vaucluse) was a French road racing cyclist.

In the 1934 Tour de France, Vietto, a relative unknown, got wings on the mountains. This was not a surprise, because he had won the Grand Prix Wolber. He was prepared for the Alps and won easily on the steepest terrain. After he won the two major Alpine stages, journalists reported that this 'boy' could be the purest mountain climber that France knew.

During the 1934 Tour, he was poised to be race leader after his team leader Antonin Magne crashed during stage 16. Vietto was unaware of Magne's situation; his advantage gave him the virtual race lead. A marshal on a motorcycle caught Vietto to inform him his captain was on the side of the road, with team-mate Lapébie ahead, and the other team-mates behind the yellow jersey. Vietto turned and rode back up the mountain into the descending riders (at the time, reversing course was legal, but is no longer so), to give Magne his bike. Magne mounted Vietto's bike and with Lapébie closed the gap to preserve his overall lead and win the Tour. A photograph shows Vietto sitting on a stone wall as the race passes.

This made him a star in France. The image of a 20-year-old who sacrificed his chance of winning the Tour doubled his popularity. Vietto was nevertheless named the Tour's best climber; he finished 5th overall, almost 1 hour behind Magne. Vietto never won the Tour. He was closest in 1939, when he gained the yellow jersey in Lorient in one of the first stages, but in the mountains, once his favorite place, he was left by Sylvère Maes. After that Tour, war broke out and the race wasn't held until 1947. Vietto, still loved, attacked from the second stage. As a result, he took the yellow jersey in Brussels, to lose it two days before the finish, in a time trial of 139 km.

Despite failing to hold the lead, Vietto wore the yellow jersey for 15 stages during the 1938 Tour de France and during the 1947 Tour de France for 14 stages. He finished second in 1939, fifth in 1934 and 1947 and eighth in 1935. Until Fabian Cancellara broke his record in the 2012 Tour de France, Vietto had the highest career yellow jersey statistics of anyone to never win the Tour de France overall.

Vietto lost a toe to sepsis in 1947. Legend has it that Vietto insisted his domestique, Apo Lazaridès, cut off one of his own toes to match. According to legend, Vietto's toe is in formaldehyde in a bar in Marseilles.

Major results

1934
Tour de France:
Mountains classification
Winner stage 7, 9, 11 and 18
5th place overall classification
Grand Prix Wolber
1935
Tour de France:
Winner stage 6 and 9
8th place overall classification
Paris–Nice
1939
Tour de France:
2nd place overall classification
holding yellow jersey for 11 days
1943
Circuit du Midi
1946
Grand Prix de la République
1947
Tour de France:
Winner stage 2 and 9
5th place overall classification
holding yellow jersey for 15 days

Notes

External links
 

1914 births
1988 deaths
People from Le Cannet
French male cyclists
French Tour de France stage winners
French Vuelta a España stage winners
Sportspeople from Alpes-Maritimes
Cyclists from Provence-Alpes-Côte d'Azur